Marvin Cottage is a historic cure cottage located at Saranac Lake, town of North Elba in Essex County, New York.  It was built about 1900 and is a two-story wood frame dwelling with a gable roof that extends from the front of the house to create a verandah. It features a large, gabled cure porch dormer and a second floor sleeping porch.  It was operated as a private, non-nursing sanatorium.

It was listed on the National Register of Historic Places in 1992.  It is located in the Helen Hill Historic District.

References

Houses on the National Register of Historic Places in New York (state)
Houses completed in 1900
Houses in Essex County, New York
Bungalow architecture in New York (state)
American Craftsman architecture in New York (state)
National Register of Historic Places in Essex County, New York
Individually listed contributing properties to historic districts on the National Register in New York (state)